Riley Vigier (born October 24, 1986), otherwise known as El Phantasmo (ELP), is a Canadian professional wrestler  currently signed to New Japan Pro-Wrestling (NJPW), where he is currently performing in the Junior Heavyweight division as part of Bullet Club. He also worked for Impact Wrestling, and various independent promotions in Canada, the European Union and the United Kingdom.

Professional wrestling career

Extreme Canadian Championship Wrestling (2005–2017)
El Phantasmo's wrestling training group in 2005 included Kyle O'Reilly and Gurv Sihra. El Phantasmo's debut in professional wrestling for NWA: Extreme Canadian Championship Wrestling (ECCW) was in a battle royal at Halloween Hell in October 2005. ELP formed a tag team with Halo known as the Masked Dudes of Doom. On March 3, 2007, they became the #1 contenders to the NWA/ECCW Tag Team Championship after beating Models, Inc. in a Tables, Ladders, and Chairs match main eventing in Vancouver. After falling short on three occasions, the Masked Dudes of Doom finally won the titles in another TLC match against Chill Town on May 5 in Vancouver. After only one successful title defense, they went on to lose the titles to Greatness on Demand in a six-man tag match on July 27 in Surrey. ELP won his first ECCW Championship on July 6, 2013. He lost the championship to "Ravenous" Randy Myers on January 18, 2014 at Ballroom Brawl 1 in a ladder match. He won the ECCW Championship for the second time on January 16, 2016, at Ballroom Brawl 5 by defeating Scotty Mac in a steel cage match. ELP lost the title to Kyle O'Reilly on January 14, 2017, at Ballroom Brawl 7, in an open challenge to any TV wrestler. His last match in ECCW for 2017, was on May 27, 2017 for the Canadian Championship, where he was defeated by Andy Bird.

Pacific Cup
A regular competitor in the NWA: Extreme Canadian Championship Wrestling (ECCW) Pacific Cup tournament, El Phantasmo made it to the finals in two consecutive years. In 2008, Billy Suede won the tournament in the three-way final which also included ELP and Kyle O'Reilly. In 2009, El Phantasmo finally won the Pacific Cup by beating Rick The Weapon X and Azeem The Dream in the finals. In 2010, however, ELP lost to eventual tournament winner Artemis Spencer in the semi-finals. Though he did present Spencer with the trophy, ELP received a kick to the groin for his show of sportsmanship towards his ex-teammate and rival.

PowerZone Wrestling (2006)
ELP debuted for PowerZone Wrestling in Lethbridge, Alberta on October 11, 2006. He was defeated in an intergender wrestling match by Veronika Vice on the show's midcard.

All Star Wrestling (2007–2017)
El Phantasmo made his debut for ASW on September 15, 2007 in Comox, British Columbia against Azeem The Dream. ELP was victorious, as he was in his second appearance in Surrey on December 7. He defeated T Kasaki. He defeated Joey Ryan on March 10, 2017. His last match in ASW for 2017, was on May 26, 2017, where he was defeated by Adam Ryder.

Revolution Pro Wrestling (2017–2020) 
El Phantasmo debuted for Revolution Pro Wrestling at the Cockpit 17 on June 4, 2017, and was defeated by David Starr. In 2018, he participated in the British J Cup, a tournament he won. On May 19, 2019, he defeated David Starr in a ladder match at RPW's Epic Encounter event to win the RPW British Cruiserweight Championship for the first time. On February 14, 2020, El Phantasmo lost the title to Michael Oku, ending his reign at 280 days.

New Japan Pro-Wrestling (2019–present)

Junior Heavyweight Tag Team Championship reigns (2019–2021)
During the first night of the New Japan Cup 2019, a vignette was shown promoting El Phantasmo's debut. In doing so, he was announced as the newest member of Bullet Club. In his debut, he pinned Will Ospreay in a tag team match. His first singles win came against Bandido shortly after. El Phantasmo then entered the Best of the Super Juniors 2019 and ended third in his block ending with 6 wins and 3 losses with a total of 12 points. On June 16, 2019, El Phantasmo and Taiji Ishimori defeated Roppongi 3K to win the IWGP Junior Heavyweight Tag Team Championships. at Kizuna Road Night Four, El Phantasmo, Yujiro Takahashi and Chase Owens competed for the NEVER Openweight Six-Man Tag Team Championship but were defeated by Ryusuke Taguchi, Togi Makabe and Toru Yano. At Southern Showdown Night One, he defended his RPW British Cruiserweight Championship against Rocky Romero. On August 25, Phantasmo defeated Dragon Lee to win the 2019 Super J-Cup tournament. 
At Royal Quest, El Phantasmo and Taiji Ishimori lost to Chaos (Will Ospreay and Robbie Eagles). At Road To Destruction Yamaguchi, Bullet Club (El Phantasmo, Chase Owens, and Taiji Ishimori) defeated Robbie Eagles, Will Ospreay, and Tomoaki Honma in a six man tag team match. At King of Pro-Wrestling (2019), El Phantasmo lost to Will Ospreay in an IWGP Junior Heavyweight Championship match. At Wrestle Kingdom 14, El Phantasmo and Taiji Ishimori lost the IWGP Junior Heavyweight Tag Team Championship to Roppongi 3K (Yoh and Sho). At New Year Dash!!, El Phantasmo and Taiji Ishimori competed in Fatal 4-way tag team match which was won by Suzuki-gun (Yoshinobu Kanemaru and El Desperado). On December 12, Phantasmo defeated A. C. H. in the finals of the Super J-Cup. Immediately after the match, Phantasmo called out Hiromu Takahashi and accepted his challenge to a match at Wrestle Kingdom 15, where the winner will face IWGP Junior Heavyweight Champion Taiji Ishimori on the 2nd night of Wrestle Kingdom for the title. On Night 1, Phantasmo lost to Takahashi, who earnt the title match on Night 2.

On January 23 at the Road to THE NEW BEGINNING, Phantasmo and Ishimori defeated Desperado and Kanemaru to win the IWGP Junior Tag-Team titles once again., however, they lost them back to the duo a month later. At Castle Attack, Phantasmo failed to win the IWGP Junior Heavyweight Championship, losing a three-way match to Bushi and El Desperado. At Kizuna Road, Phantasmo and Ishimori, defeated Roppongi 3k to once again win the IWGP Junior Heavyweight Championships, after Phantasmo hit a superkick which was questioned to be loaded with an metal slug, which was a foreign, illegal weapon. They retained the titles against Mega Coaches (Rocky Romero and Ryusuke Taguchi) at Wrestle Grand Slam in Tokyo Dome. The duo entered the Super Junior Tag League, but the tournament was won by Desperado and Kanemaru. The title match was scheduled for Wrestle Grand Slam in MetLife Dome, where Phantasmo and Ishimori lost the titles.

In November, Phantasmo entered the Best of the Super Juniors tournament and finished with 12 points with a record of 6 wins and 5 losses, failing to advance to the finals. At Wrestle Kingdom 16, Ishimori and Phantasmo now going by the name of Bullet Club's Cutest Tag Team, failed to regain the IWGP Junior Heavyweight Tag Team Championships, after losing a three-way match between Mega Coaches and champions Flying Tiger (Robbie Eagles and Tiger Mask), who retained. During the match, Mega Coaches and Flying Tiger, removed Phantasmo's boot and revealed the metal slug, ending his use of the weapon in matches.

Heavyweight Division  (2022–present)
During the NJPW New Years Golden Series tour, Bullet Club's Cutest Tag Team failed to capture the Junior Heavyweight titles once again. During this time, Phantasmo expressed interest in competing as a Zheavyweight wrestler.

After showing promise against heavyweight wrestlers, Phantasmo entered his first Heavyweight tournament, the New Japan Cup. He received a bye to the second round, but was defeated by Will Ospreay. Phantasmo continued to be classed as a Junior Heavyweight, as he entered the Best of the Super Juniors, finishing the tournament with 12 points, with a record of 6 wins and 3 losses and the last match loss to El Desperado, preventing him making the finals. At AEW x NJPW: Forbidden Door a supershow between New Japan Pro-Wrestling and American Wrestling Promotion All Elite Wrestling, Phantasmo teamed with former Bullet Club Members The Young Bucks to take on Dudes with Attitude (Sting, Darby Allin and Shingo Takagi), where they were defeated.

Impressive performances earnt Phantasmo a place in the heavyweight G1 Climax 32 tournament, where he competed in the D Block. He finished the tournament with 6 points, failing to advance to the semi-finals. After his tournament campaign ended, Phantasmo officially announced his transition into the Heavyweight division.

Impact Wrestling (2021–2022) 
On the April 29th episode of Impact!, it was announced via vignette that ELP would make his Impact Wrestling debut sometime in the following weeks. During the next episode, ELP made his in-ring debut, soundly defeating enhancement talent, VSK. The week afterwards, ELP won a six-way, number-one contender's match for the right to challenge Josh Alexander for the Impact X Division Championship at Under Siege. At the event, he failed to defeat Alexander for the title. ELP made his return to the company on the September 23 episode of Impact!, assisting fellow Bullet Club members Hikuleo and Chris Bey during their feud against FinJuice (David Finlay and Juice Robinson). In October, Phantasmo entered a tournament to determine the new Impact X Division Champion, where he defeated Willie Mack and Rohit Raju in the first round but lost to Trey Miguel in the final at Bound for Glory.

On May 7, 2022, at Under Siege, Phantasmo made his return to the company by teaming with Bullet Club for a 10-man tag team match against Honor No More in a losing effort.

Personal life 
Vigier grew up in Maple Ridge, British Columbia, Canada. He graduated from Westview Secondary School in 2004. He graduated from the Art Institute of Vancouver with a diploma for digital film and video program in 2006. He would help design event posters, intro videos, and individual match screens for ECCW. From 2010 to 2017, he was an animatic editor for Bardel Entertainment.

Championships and accomplishments
German Wrestling Federation
Light Heavyweight World Cup (2019)
New Japan Pro-Wrestling
IWGP Junior Heavyweight Tag Team Championships (3 times) - with Taiji Ishimori
Super J-Cup (2019, 2020)
 NWA: Extreme Canadian Championship Wrestling
ECCW Championship (3 times) 
 ECCW Tag Team Championship (1 time) with Halo
 Pacific Cup Tournament (2009)
Most Popular Wrestler of the Year (2008)
Wrestler of the Year award (2008)
 Pro Wrestling Illustrated
 Ranked No. 170 of the top 500 singles wrestlers in the PWI 500 in 2020
Revolution Pro Wrestling
RPW British Cruiserweight Championship (1 time)
British J Cup (2018)

Luchas de Apuestas record

References

External links

 
 
 
 
 eccw.com

1986 births
Bullet Club members
Canadian male professional wrestlers
IWGP Junior Heavyweight Tag Team Champions
Undisputed British Cruiserweight Champions
Living people
Professional wrestlers from Vancouver